Rovana Plumb (born 22 June 1960) is a Romanian politician of the Social Democratic Party (PSD). She was appointed Minister of Environment and Forests (now Minister of Environment and Climate Change) on 7 May 2012. From 5 March 2014 to 9 November 2015, she was the Minister of Labor, Family, Social Protection and Elderly in the Government of Romania. In March 2015, Rovana Plumb was elected President of the National Council of PSD.

Early life and education
Plumb attended the Bucharest Academy of Economic Studies (ASE).

Political career
Plumb served as a member of the Parliament of Romania from 2004 to 2007 and the European Parliament from 2009 to 2012. In that capacity, she was a member of the Committee on Budgets (2007) and the Committee on Employment and Social Affairs (2007–2012).

Following the 2019 European elections, Plumb rejoined the European Parliament and was elected vice-chair of the S&D Group, under the leadership of chairwoman Iratxe García. She also joined the Committee on the Environment, Public Health and Food Safety.

Controversy
Plumb was named in a corruption case in 2017, in which she was accused of aiding the leader of her Social Democratic Party (PSD) in an illicit real estate deal involving ownership of an island in the Danube River.

References

External links

1960 births
21st-century Romanian women politicians
Bucharest Academy of Economic Studies alumni
Living people
Members of the Chamber of Deputies (Romania)
MEPs for Romania 2007–2009
MEPs for Romania 2009–2014
MEPs for Romania 2019–2024
Politicians from Bucharest
Romanian Ministers of the Environment
Romanian Ministers of Labor
Social Democratic Party (Romania) MEPs
Women European Commissioners
Women members of the Romanian Cabinet
Women MEPs for Romania
21st-century Romanian politicians